Potentilla thurberi, the scarlet cinquefoil, is a species of Potentilla Found in North America (Arizona, New Mexico) in moist soils along streams or in damp meadows from 5,000-9,000 ft (1524-2743 m); flowers July-September. 
It is of the rose family so it smells like a rose.

References

External links
 
 

thurberi